The Grant Street Pier is a feature of the Vancouver Waterfront Park in Vancouver, Washington, United States.

History
Ground broke in 2016.

Reception
In 2019, the structure received an American Public Works Association Award.

References

External links
 

Buildings and structures in Vancouver, Washington
Piers in Washington (state)